The Planning Service is an Executive within the Department of the Environment (Northern Ireland), which regulates the development and the use of land in the public interest.

Origins 
The Town and Country Planning Service was established in 1973 when the responsibilities of the local planning authorities briefly passed to the Ministry of Development and then to the Department of Housing, Local Government and Planning before being assimilated into the Department of the Environment for Northern Ireland. The Department's statutory planning functions are currently contained in the Planning (Northern Ireland) Order 1991 and associated subordinate legislation.

The Town and Country Planning Service became an Executive Agency (known as "the Planning Service") of the Department of the Environment for Northern Ireland on 1 April 1996.

Following devolution of authority to the Northern Ireland Executive in 1998, the "Department of The Environment for Northern Ireland" was renamed "The Department of The Environment". Some of the functions previously undertaken by the "old" Department were transferred to other Northern Ireland Departments. Planning Service remains an Executive within the Department of The Environment.

Functions 
 Provide operational planning policy, Development Plans and high quality professional planning decisions.
 Improve delivery of services, having regard to the effective use of available resources, Section 75 of and Schedule 9 to the Northern Ireland Act 1998 and associated human rights and equality policies.
 Improve the quality of services available to customers in line with the principles of Service First - The New Charter Programme and the Agency’s Charter Standards Statement.
 Provide an accurate and speedy land and property information service to the conveyancing community
 Ensure that Development Plans, Planning Policies and Development Control promote the orderly and consistent use of land.
 Obtain best value and efficiency in the management of the Agency.
 Develop and maintain effective financial and management information systems
 Maintain high levels of motivation, skills and performance of staff
 Explore opportunities for and introduce, where practicable, Public Private Partnership arrangements

References

External links 
 Planning Service homepage

Northern Ireland Executive